The Research Triangle, or simply The Triangle, are both common nicknames for a metropolitan area in the Piedmont region of North Carolina in the United States, anchored by the cities of Raleigh and Durham and the town of Chapel Hill, home to three major research universities: North Carolina State University, Duke University, and University of North Carolina at Chapel Hill, respectively. The nine-county region, officially named the Raleigh–Durham–Cary combined statistical area (CSA), comprises the Raleigh–Cary and Durham–Chapel Hill Metropolitan Statistical Areas and the Henderson Micropolitan Statistical Area.  The "Triangle" name originated in the 1950s with the creation of Research Triangle Park, located between the three anchor cities and home to numerous high tech companies.

In 2019, a U.S. Census estimate put the population at 2,079,687, making it the second largest combined statistical area in the state of North Carolina behind Charlotte CSA. The Raleigh–Durham television market includes a broader 24-county area which includes Fayetteville, North Carolina, and has a population of 2,726,000 persons.

Most of the Triangle is part of North Carolina's first, second, fourth, ninth, and thirteenth congressional districts.

The region is sometimes confused with The Triad, which is a North Carolina region adjacent to and directly west of the Triangle comprising Greensboro, Winston-Salem, and High Point, among other cities.

Counties 

Depending on which definition of the Research Triangle region is used, as few as three or as many as 16 counties are included as part of the region. All of these counties when included hold a population of over 2,167,000 people.

The three core counties of Wake, Durham and Orange are the homes of the three research universities for which the area is named.

The 2020 members of the Research Triangle Regional Partnership are:
 Chatham
 Durham
 Franklin
 Granville
 Johnston
 Lee
 Person
 Wake
 Vance

NC Regional Councils of Governments Definition 
All counties in the State of North Carolina are in one of 16 regional councils which provide programs and services to local governments.  The Triangle J Council of Governments includes Chatham, Durham, Johnston, Lee, Moore, Orange, and Wake Counties.  The northern Triangle counties of Person, Granville, Franklin, Vance and Warren are part of the Kerr-Tar Regional Council of Governments.

Office of Management and Budget Definition 

As of September 14, 2018, the US Office of Management and Budget (OMB) delineated the Raleigh-Durham-Cary Combined Statistical Area as consisting of two metropolitan and one micropolitan statistical areas.  Those three statistical areas in turn are defined as consisting of a total of nine counties.  The MSAs and their constituent counties are:
 Durham-Chapel Hill Metropolitan SA
 Chatham County
 Durham County
 Granville County
 Orange County
 Person County
 Henderson Micropolitan SA
 Vance County
 Raleigh-Cary Metropolitan SA
 Franklin County
 Johnston County
 Wake County

Prior to September 2018, the OMB had used the name Raleigh-Durham-Chapel Hill Combined Statistical Area and it included several additional counties. The Dunn Micropolitan Statistical Area (Harnett County) and Sanford Micropolitan Statistical Area (Lee County) were moved to the Fayetteville-Sanford-Lumberton Combined Statistical Area, while the Oxford Micropolitan Statistical Area (Granville County) was folded into the Durham-Chapel Hill Metropolitan Statistical Area. The Raleigh Metropolitan Statistical Area was also renamed the Raleigh-Cary Metropolitan Statistical Area.

The table below outlines the populations of the constituent counties of the Raleigh–Durham-Cary Combined Statistical Area as of the 2020 Census.

Cities 

The Triangle region, as defined for statistical purposes as the Raleigh–Durham–Cary CSA, comprises nine counties, although the U.S. Census Bureau divided the region into two metropolitan statistical areas and one micropolitan area in 2003. The Raleigh-Cary metropolitan area comprises Wake, Franklin, and Johnston Counties; the Durham-Chapel Hill metropolitan area comprises Durham, Orange, Chatham, Granville, and Person Counties; and the Henderson micropolitan area comprises Vance County.

Some area television stations define the region as Raleigh–Durham–Fayetteville.

15 largest municipalities

Education 
Public secondary education in the Triangle is similar to that of the majority of the state of North Carolina, in which there are county-wide school systems (the exception is Chapel Hill-Carrboro City Schools within Orange County but apart from Orange County Schools). Based in Cary, the Wake County Public School System, which includes the cities of Raleigh and Cary, is the largest school system in the state of North Carolina and the 15th-largest in the United States, with average daily enrollment of 159,949 as of the second month of the 2016–17 school year. Other larger systems in the region include Durham Public Schools (about 33,000 students) and rapidly growing Johnston County Schools (about 31,000 students).

Institutions of higher education 

 Campbell University
 Central Carolina Community College
 Duke University
 Durham Technical Community College
 Louisburg College
 Meredith College
 North Carolina Central University
 North Carolina State University
 Piedmont Community College
 Shaw University
 Southeastern Baptist Theological Seminary and The College at Southeastern
 St. Augustine's College
 University of North Carolina at Chapel Hill
 Vance-Granville Community College
 Wake Technical Community College
 William Peace University

Sports

College sports 

With the significant number of universities and colleges in the area and the relative absence of major league professional sports, NCAA sports are very popular, particularly those sports in which the Atlantic Coast Conference participates, most notably basketball.

The Duke Blue Devils (representing Duke University in Durham), NC State Wolfpack (representing North Carolina State University in Raleigh), and North Carolina Tar Heels (representing the University of North Carolina at Chapel Hill) are all members of the ACC. Rivalries among these schools are very strong, fueled by proximity to each other, with annual competitions in every sport. Adding to the rivalries is the large number of graduates the high schools in the region send to each of the local universities. It is very common for students at one university to know many students attending the other local universities, which increases the opportunities for "bragging" among the schools. The four ACC schools in the state, Duke, North Carolina, North Carolina State, and Wake Forest University (the last of which was originally located in the town of Wake Forest before moving to Winston-Salem in 1956), are referred to as Tobacco Road by sportscasters, particularly in basketball. All four teams consistently produce high-caliber teams . Each of the Triangle-based universities listed has won at least two NCAA Basketball national championships.

Three historically black colleges, including recent Division I arrival North Carolina Central University and Division II members St. Augustine College and Shaw University also boost the popularity of college sports in the region.

Other colleges in the Triangle that field intercollegiate teams include Campbell University, Meredith College, and William Peace University.

The Triangle will host the World University Summer Games in 2029.

Professional sports 

The region has only one professional team of the four major sports, the Carolina Hurricanes of the NHL, based in Raleigh. Since moving to the Research Triangle region from Hartford, Connecticut, they have enjoyed great success, including winning a Stanley Cup. With only one top-level professional sports option, minor league sports are quite popular in the region. The Durham Bulls in downtown Durham are a AAA Minor League baseball affiliate of the Tampa Bay Rays, and the Carolina Mudcats, based in Zebulon, 10 miles east of Raleigh, are the Advanced-A affiliate of the Milwaukee Brewers. In Cary, North Carolina FC plays in the second-level United Soccer League, and the North Carolina Courage began play in the National Women's Soccer League in 2017 after the owner of North Carolina FC bought the NWSL franchise rights of the Western New York Flash and relocated the NWSL franchise to the Triangle.

The area also had a team in the fledgling World League of American Football – however, the Raleigh–Durham Skyhawks, coached by Roman Gabriel, did not exactly cover themselves in glory; they lost all 10 games of their inaugural (and only) season in 1991. The team folded after that, being replaced in the league by the Ohio Glory, which fared little better at 1–9, ultimately suffering the same fate – along with the other six teams based in North America – when the league took a two-year hiatus, returning as a six-team all-European league in 1995.

Commerce 

The region's growing high-technology community includes such companies as IBM, Lenovo, SAS Institute, Cisco Systems, NetApp, Red Hat, EMC Corporation, and Credit Suisse First Boston. In addition to high-tech, the region is consistently ranked in the top three in the U.S. with concentration in life science companies. Some of these companies include GlaxoSmithKline, Biogen Idec, BASF, Merck & Co., Novo Nordisk, Novozymes, and Pfizer. Research Triangle Park and North Carolina State University's Centennial Campus in Raleigh support innovation through R&D and technology transfer among the region's companies and research universities (including Duke University and the University of North Carolina at Chapel Hill).

The area fared relatively well during the late-2000s recession, ranked as the strongest region in North Carolina by the Brookings Institution and among the top 40 in the country.  The change in unemployment during 2008 to 2009 was 4.6% and home prices was 2%.  The Greensboro metropolitan area was listed among the second-weakest and the Charlotte area among the middle in the country.

Major employers

Major hospitals, medical centers and medical schools 

The Research Triangle region is served by these hospitals and medical centers:
 Hospitals of the Duke University Health System
 Duke Ambulatory Surgery Center (Durham)
 Duke Children's Hospital and Health Center (Durham)
 Duke Raleigh Hospital (formerly Raleigh Community Hospital)
 Duke University Medical Center (Durham)
 Duke Regional Hospital (formerly Durham Regional Hospital)
 Person Memorial Hospital (Roxboro)
 Hospitals of the UNC Health Care system
 Chatham Hospital (Siler City)
 North Carolina Cancer Hospital (Chapel Hill)
 North Carolina Children's Hospital (Chapel Hill)
 North Carolina Memorial Hospital (Chapel Hill)
 North Carolina Neurosciences Hospital (Chapel Hill)
 North Carolina Women's Hospital (Chapel Hill)
 Rex Hospital (Raleigh)
 Johnston Medical Center (Smithfield)
 Hospitals of the WakeMed system
 WakeMed Raleigh Campus (formerly Wake Memorial Hospital and Wake Medical Center)
 WakeMed Cary Hospital (formerly Western Wake Medical Center)
 Other hospitals and medical centers
 Central Regional Hospital,(Butner)
 Durham VA Medical Center (Durham)
 Franklin Regional Medical Center (Louisburg)
 Harnett Health System (Dunn)
 Betsy Johnson Regional Hospital
 Angier Medical Services
 Good Hope Hospital
 Betsy Johnson Cancer Research Clinic
 Central Harnett Hospital
 Medical Schools
 Duke University School of Medicine
 University of North Carolina at Chapel Hill School of Medicine
 Campbell University School of Osteopathic Medicine

Transportation

Freeways and primary designated routes 

The Triangle proper is served by three major interstate highways: I-40, I-85, and I-87 along with their spurs: I-440 and I-540, and seven U.S. Routes: 1, 15, 64, 70, 264, 401, and 501. US Highways 15 and 501 are multiplexed through much of the region as US 15-501. I-95 passes 30 miles east of Raleigh through Johnston County, with I-87 connecting I-95 at Rocky Mount, NC to Raleigh via the US 64–264 Bypass.

The two interstates diverge from one another in Orange County, with I-85 heading northeast through northern Durham County toward Virginia, while I-40 travels southeast through southern Durham, through the center of the region, and serves as the primary freeway through Raleigh. The related loop freeways I-440 and I-540 are primarily located in Wake County around Raleigh. I-440 begins at the interchange of US 1 and I-40 southwest of downtown Raleigh and arcs as a multiplex with US 1 northward around downtown with the formal designation as the Cliff Benson/Raleigh Beltline (cosigned with US 1 on three-fourths of its northern route) and ends at its junction with I-40 in southeast Raleigh. I-540, sometimes known as the Raleigh Outer Loop, extends from the US 64–264 Bypass to I-40 just inside Durham County, where it continues across the interstate as a state route (NC 540), prior to its becoming a toll road from the NC 54 interchange to the current terminus at NC Highway 55 near Holly Springs. I-95 serves the extreme eastern edge of the region, crossing north–south through suburban Johnston County.

U.S. Routes 1, 15, and 64 primarily serve the region as limited-access freeways or multilane highways with access roads. US 1 enters the region from the southwest as the Claude E. Pope Memorial Highway and travels through suburban Apex where it merges with US 64 and continues northeast through Cary. The two highways are codesignated for about  until US 1 joins I-440 and US 64 with I-40 along the Raleigh–Cary border. Capital Boulevard, which is designated US 1 for half of its route and US 401 the other is not a limited-access freeway, although it is a major thoroughfare through northeast Raleigh and into the northern downtown area.

North Carolina Highway 147 is a limited-access freeway that connects I-85 with Toll Route NC 540 in northwestern Wake County. The older, toll-free portion of the four-lane route—known as the Durham Freeway or the I.L. "Buck" Dean Expressway—traverses downtown Durham and extends through Research Triangle Park to I-40. The Durham Freeway is often used as a detour or alternate route for I-40 through southwestern Durham the Chapel Hill area in cases of traffic accident, congestion or road construction delays. The tolled portion of NC 147, called the Triangle Expressway—North Carolina's first modern toll road when it opened to traffic in late 2011—continues past I-40 to Toll NC 540. Both Toll NC 147 and Toll NC 540 are modern facilities which collect tolls using transponders and license plate photo-capture technology.

Public transit 

A partnering system of multiple public transportation agencies currently serves the Triangle region under the joint GoTransit branding. Raleigh is served by GoRaleigh (formerly Capital Area Transit) municipal transit system, while Durham has GoDurham (formerly the Durham Area Transit Authority). Chapel Hill is served by Chapel Hill Transit, and Cary is served by GoCary (formerly C-Tran) public transit systems. However, GoTriangle, formerly called Triangle Transit, works in cooperation with all area transit systems by offering transfers between its own routes and those of the other systems. Triangle Transit also coordinates an extensive vanpool and rideshare program that serves the region's larger employers and commute destinations.

Plans have been made to merge all of the area's municipal systems into Triangle Transit, and Triangle Transit also has proposed a regional rail system to connect downtown Durham, downtown Cary and downtown Raleigh with multiple suburban stops, as well as stops in the Research Triangle Park area. The agency's initial proposal was effectively cancelled in 2006, however, when the agency could not procure adequate federal funding. A committee of local business, transportation and government leaders currently are working with Triangle Transit to develop a new transit blueprint for the region, with various modes of rail transit, as well as bus rapid transit, open as options for consideration.

Air

Raleigh–Durham International Airport (RDU)
 

Raleigh–Durham International Airport (RDU) has nonstop passenger service to 68 destinations with over 450 average daily departures, including nonstop international service to Canada, Europe, and Mexico. The airport covers 5,000 acres (2,023 ha) and has three runways.

In 1939 the General Assembly of North Carolina chartered the Raleigh–Durham Aeronautical Authority, which was changed in 1945 to the Raleigh–Durham Airport Authority. The first new terminal opened in 1955. Terminal A (now Terminal 1) opened in 1981. American Airlines began service to RDU in 1985.

RDU opened the  runway, 5L-23R, in 1986. American Airlines opened its north–south hub operation at RDU in the new Terminal C in June 1987, greatly increasing the size of RDU's operations with a new terminal including a new apron and runway. American brought RDU its first international flights to Bermuda, Cancun, Paris and London.

In 1996, American Airlines ceased its hub operations at RDU due to Pan Am and Eastern Airlines. Pan Am and Eastern were Miami's main tenants until 1991, when both carriers went bankrupt. Their hubs at MIA were taken over by United Airlines and American Airlines. This created a difficulty in competing with US Airways' hub in Charlotte and Delta Air Lines' hub in Atlanta, Georgia for passengers traveling between smaller cities in the North and South. Midway Airlines entered the market, starting service in 1995 with the then somewhat novel concept of 50-seat Canadair Regional Jets providing service from its RDU hub primarily along the East Coast. Midway, originally incorporated in Chicago, had some success after moving its operations to the midpoint of the eastern United States at RDU and its headquarters to Morrisville, NC. The carrier ultimately could not overcome three weighty challenges: the arrival of Southwest Airlines, the refusal of American Airlines to renew the frequent flyer affiliation it had with Midway (thus dispatching numerous higher fare-paying businesspeople to airlines with better reward destinations), and the significant blow of September 11, 2001. Midway Airlines filed Chapter 11 bankruptcy on August 13, 2001, and ceased operations entirely on October 30, 2003.

In February 2000, RDU was ranked as the nation's second fastest-growing major airport in the United States, by Airports Council International, based on 1999 statistics. Passenger growth hit 24% over the previous year, ranking RDU second only to Washington Dulles International Airport. RDU opened Terminal A south concourse for use by Northwest and Continental Airlines in 2001. The addition added  and five aircraft gates to the terminal. Terminal A became designated as Terminal 1 on October 26, 2008. In 2003, RDU also dedicated a new general aviation terminal. RDU continues to keep pace with its growth by redeveloping Terminal C into a new state-of-the-art terminal, now known as Terminal 2, which opened in October 2008. 

As of June 2022, the airport will have international flights to Cancun, London, Montreal, Paris, Reykjavik and Toronto. Cancun service is provided by American, Frontier and JetBlue, while the Canada flights are provided by Air Canada, Paris by Delta, Reykjavik by new to the market Icelandair, and London by American. Icelandair is the first international carrier outside of Air Canada to service the airport. Delta Air Lines currently considers the airport to be a "focus city", or an airport that is not a hub, but is of importance to the carrier.  The COVID-19 pandemic significantly shrunk the operation, but by September 2022, Delta will be serving 21 destinations on aircraft ranging from the CRJ700 to the 767.

Public general-aviation airports 
In addition to RDU, several smaller publicly owned general-aviation airports also operate in the metropolitan region:

 Triangle North Executive Airport , Louisburg
 Raleigh Exec , Sanford
 Johnston County Airport , Smithfield
 Horace Williams Airport , Chapel Hill (Closed)
 Harnett Regional Jetport , Erwin
 Person County Airport , Roxboro
 Siler City Municipal Airport , Siler City

Private airfields 
Several licensed private general-aviation and agricultural airfields are located in the region's suburban areas and nearby rural communities:

 Bagwell Airport , Garner
 Ball Airport , Louisburg
 Barclaysville Field Airport , Angier
 Brooks Field Airport , Siler City
 CAG Farms Airport , Angier
 Charles Field Airport , Dunn
 Cox Airport , Apex
 Crooked Creek Airport , Bunn
 Dead Dog Airport , Pittsboro
 Deck Airpark Airport , Apex
 Dutchy Airport , Chapel Hill
 Eagle's Landing Airport , Pittsboro
 Field of Dreams Airport , Zebulon
 Fuquay/Angier Field Airport , Fuquay-Varina
 Hinton Field Airport , Princeton
 Kenly Airport , Kenly
 Lake Ridge Aero Park Airport , Durham
 Miles Airport , Chapel Hill
 North Raleigh Airport , Louisburg
 Peacock Stolport Airport , Garner
 Raleigh East Airport , Knightdale
 Riley Field Airport , Bunn
 Ron's Field Ultralight Airport , Pittsboro
 Triple W Airport , Raleigh
 Womble Field Airport , Chapel Hill

Heliports 
These licensed heliports serve the Research Triangle region:

 Betsy Johnson Memorial Hospital Heliport , Dunn—publicly owned; medical service
 Duke University North Heliport , Durham—privately owned; public medical service
 Garner Road Heliport , Raleigh—publicly owned; state government service
 Holly Green Heliport , Durham—private
 Sky-5 Heliport , Raleigh—private, owned by Sky-5 Inc. (WRAL-TV)
 Sprint MidAtlantic Telecom Heliport , Youngsville—private; corporate service
 Wake Medical Center Heliport , Raleigh—publicly owned; medical service
 Western Wake Medical Center Heliport , Cary—publicly owned; medical service

A number of helipads (i.e. marked landing sites not classified under the FAA LID system) also serve a variety of additional medical facilities (such as UNC Hospitals in Chapel Hill), as well as private, corporate and governmental interests, throughout the region.

Rail 
Amtrak serves the region with the Silver Meteor, Silver Star, Palmetto, Carolinian, and Piedmont routes.

Shopping 
Notable shopping centers and malls:

Super-regional enclosed malls 
 Triangle Town Center and Commons (Raleigh; 1,431,091 ft²) (opened 2002)
 The Streets at Southpoint (Durham; 1,336,000 ft²) (opened 2002)
 Crabtree Valley Mall (Raleigh; 1,326,000 ft²) (opened 1972)
 Cary Towne Center (Cary; 914,252 ft²) (opened 1979, closed 2021)
 Northgate Mall (Durham; 857,099 ft²) (opened 1960, enclosed 1972, closed 2020)

Major shopping centers 
 Crossroads Plaza (Cary; 1,300,000 ft²)
 Village District (Raleigh; 656,000 ft²)
 Carolina Premium Outlets (Smithfield; 440,000 ft²)
 University Place (Chapel Hill; 366,000 ft²)
 Carr Mill Mall (Carrboro; 86,000 ft²)

 Tanger Outlet Center (Mebane; 317,000 ft²)
 North Hills Mall & Plaza (Raleigh)

Entertainment 
Film festivals and events:
 Full Frame Documentary Film Festival – Durham
 North Carolina Gay & Lesbian Film Festival – Durham

Notable performing arts and music venues:
  Coastal Credit Union Music Park – Raleigh
 Red Hat Amphitheater – downtown Raleigh
 Koka Booth Amphitheatre at Regency Park – Cary
 Progress Energy Center for the Performing Arts – downtown Raleigh
 PNC Arena – Raleigh
 Durham Performing Arts Center – Durham
 Carolina Theatre – Durham
Theatre and dance events:
 American Dance Festival – Durham

Music festivals:
 Dreamville Festival – Raleigh
 Hopscotch Music Festival – Raleigh
 Moogfest – Durham
 ProgDay – Chapel Hill
Movie theatres:
 Alamo Drafthouse Cinema

Museums

Media 
The area is part of the Raleigh–Durham–Fayetteville television designated media area and is the 25th-largest in the country with 1,135,920 households (2014) included in that area and the second largest television market in North Carolina.  It is part of the Raleigh–Durham Nielsen Audio radio market (code 115) and is the 42nd-largest in the country with a population of 1,365,900.

The Raleigh–Durham–Fayetteville market is defined by Nielsen as including Chatham, Cumberland, Dunn, Durham, Granville, Halifax, Harnett, Hoke, Johnston, Lee, Moore, Northampton, Orange, Robeson, Vance, Wake, Warren, Wayne, and Wilson Counties, along with parts of Franklin County.

Print 
Numerous newspapers and periodicals serve the Triangle market.

Paid and subscription 
 The News & Observer, the major daily Raleigh newspaper and the region's largest, with a significant regional and statewide readership (especially to the east of the Triangle)
 The Herald-Sun, the major daily Durham newspaper
 Garner News, the weekly community newspaper for suburban Garner in southern Wake County
 The Apex Herald, the weekly community newspaper for suburban Apex in western Wake County
 Holly Springs Sun, the weekly community newspaper for suburban Holly Springs in southwestern Wake County
 Butner-Creedmoor News The Weekly community newspaper for southern Granville County and surrounding areas
 Cleveland Post, the weekly community newspaper for suburban Cleveland and nearby northwestern Johnston and southern Wake Counties
 Fuquay-Varina Independent, the weekly community newspaper for suburban Fuquay-Varina in southwestern Wake County
 The Wake Weekly, a weekly community newspaper serving suburban Wake Forest, northern Wake County and southern Franklin County
 The Chatham Journal, the weekly community newspaper for suburban Pittsboro and surrounding Chatham County
 The Clayton News-Star, a weekly community newspaper for suburban Clayton and western Johnston County
 The Daily Record, the daily community newspaper for suburban Dunn and surrounding Harnett County
 The Courier-Times, the semiweekly community newspaper for suburban Roxboro and Person County
 The Triangle Business Journal, a weekly regional economic journal
 Cary Magazine, a bi-monthly magazine for Cary and western Wake County
 Chapel Hill Magazine, a bi-monthly magazine that serves 12,500 households and 1,600 businesses of Chapel Hill, Carrboro, Hillsborough and northern Chatham County

Free 
 The Independent Weekly, a free weekly regional independent journal published in Durham
 The Carolina Journal, a monthly free regional newspaper published in Raleigh
 The Raleigh Downtowner, a free monthly magazine for downtown Raleigh and environs
 The Raleigh Hatchet, a free monthly magazine
 The Daily Tar Heel, the free weekday (during the regular academic year) student newspaper at UNC-Chapel Hill
 Technician, the free weekday (during the regular academic year) student newspaper at NC State University in Raleigh
 The Chronicle, a free daily newspaper for (but independent of) Duke University and its surrounding community in Durham
 The Blotter, a free monthly regional literary journal
 Fifteen-501, a free magazine for the Durham–Chapel Hill area (named for nearby U.S. Route 15-501)
 Acento Latino, a free Spanish-language weekly regional newspaper published in Raleigh

Online only 
 The Cary Citizen, a free daily news source for the greater Cary and western Wake County area
 The Raleigh Telegram, a free daily news source for the greater Raleigh area
 The Wake Forest Gazette, a free weekly news site for items of local Wake Forest interest

Television

Broadcast 
The Triangle is part of the Raleigh–Durham–Fayetteville Designated Market Area for broadcast television.  –16, the area was the 25th-largest in the country. This area includes these television stations:
 WUNC-TV (4, Chapel Hill), PBS member station and flagship station of the PBS North Carolina television network, owned by the University of North Carolina system
 WRAL-TV (5, Raleigh), NBC affiliate owned by Capitol Broadcasting Company
 WTVD (11, Durham), ABC O&O owned by ABC Owned Television Stations
 WNCN (17, Goldsboro), CBS affiliate owned by Nexstar Media Group
 WLFL (22, Raleigh), CW affiliate owned by Sinclair Broadcast Group
 WTNC-LD (26, Durham), UniMás O&O owned by TelevisaUnivision
 WRDC (28, Durham), MyNetworkTV affiliate owned by Sinclair Broadcast Group
 WRAY-TV (30, Wilson), TCT O&O owned by Tri-State Christian Television
 WUVC-DT (40, Fayetteville), Univision O&O owned by TelevisaUnivision
 WRPX-TV (47, Rocky Mount) and WFPX-TV (62, Fayetteville), both Ion Television O&Os owned by Scripps Networks
 WRAZ-TV (50, Raleigh), Fox affiliate owned by Capitol Broadcasting Company

Cable 
Raleigh is home to the Research Triangle Region bureau of the regional cable TV news channel Spectrum News 1 North Carolina.

Radio 
The Triangle is home to North Carolina Public Radio, a public radio station/NPR provider that brings in listeners around the country. Raleigh and a large part of the Triangle area is Arbitron radio market #43. Stations include:

FM stations:
 88.1 FM WKNC (NCSU) College Radio from N.C. State University
 88.5 FM WRTP (RTN) Christian ("His Radio WRTP")
 88.7 FM WXDU (DU) College Radio from Duke University
 88.9 FM WRKV (EMF) Contemporary Christian ("K-LOVE") from Educational Media Foundation
 89.3 FM WXYC (UNC) College Radio from UNC-Chapel Hill
 89.7 FM WCPE Classical & Opera Music
 90.5 FM WVRD (Liberty University) Christian
 90.7 FM WNCU (NCCU) NPR/Jazz from N.C. Central University
 91.1 FM W216BN (RTN) Christian ("His Radio WRTP") (Translator of WRTP)
 91.5 FM WUNC (UNC) NPR affiliate from UNC-Chapel Hill
 92.5 FM WYFL (BBN) Christian Programs from Bible Broadcasting Network
 93.3 FM WERO (NM License, LLC) CHR ("Bob 933")
 93.5 FM WRLY-LP Community Radio ("Oak 93.5")
 93.9 FM WNCB (iHM) Country ("B93.9")
 94.7 FM WQDR-FM (CMG) Country ("94.7 QDR")
 95.3 FM W237BZ (iHM) Classic Hip-Hop ("95.3 The Beat") (Translator of WDCG-HD2)
 96.1 FM WBBB (CMG) Adult hits ("96.1 BBB")
 96.5 FM W243DK (CBC) Sports ("The Buzz") (Translator of WCMC-HD2)
 96.7 FM WKRX Country ("Kickin' Country")
 96.9 FM WPLW-FM (CMG) CHR ("Pulse FM")
 97.5 FM WQOK (R1) Hip Hop ("K-97.5")
 97.9 FM W250B ("97.9 The Hill") (Translator of WCHL)
 98.1 FM WQSM (Cumulus) CHR ("Q-98")
 98.9 FM W255AM (RTN) Christian ("His Radio WRTP") (Translator of WRTP)
 99.3 FM W257CS (CBC) Sports ("The Buzz") (Translator of WCMC-HD2)
 99.9 FM WCMC (CBC) Sports ("99.9 The Fan ESPN Radio") (Flagship for Carolina Hurricanes)
 100.7 FM WRDU (iHM) Classic Hits ("100.7 WRDU")
 101.1 FM WYMY (CMG) Spanish ("La Ley 101.1 FM")
 101.5 FM WRAL (CBC) Adult Contemporary ("Mix 101.5")
 101.9 FM WKRP-LP Community Radio ("101 Nine WKRP")
 102.3 FM WKJO Classic Hits ("Kix 102")
 102.5 FM WKXU (CMG) Classic Hits ("Kix 102")
 102.9 FM WKIX (CMG) Classic Hits ("Kix 102")
 103.3 FM WAKG (PB) Country ("103.3 WAKG")
 103.5 FM WCOM-LP Community Radio, Variety
 103.9 FM WNNL (R1) Urban Gospel ("The Light 103.9")
 104.3 FM WFXK (R1) Urban Adult Contemporary ("Foxy 104")
 104.7 FM W284CP (CMG) Oldies ("Oldies 104.7") (Translator of WKIX)
 105.1 FM WDCG (iHM) CHR ("G-105")
 106.1 FM WTKK (iHM) Talk
 106.7 FM WKVK (EMF) Contemporary Christian
 107.1 FM WFXC (R1) Urban Adult Contemporary ("Foxy 107")
 107.7 FM W299AQ (RTN) Christian ("His Radio WRTP") (Translator of WRTP)
 107.9 FM W300AR (RTN) Christian ("His Radio WRTP") (Translator of WRTP)

AM stations:
 540 AM WETC Catholic radio
 570 AM WQDR Classic rock ("Rock 92.9")
 620 AM WDNC Sports ("620 The Ticket") (Flagship for Duke Football and Basketball)
 680 AM WPTF News, Talk & Sports ("NewsRadio 680 WPTF")
 750 AM WAUG Urban Programming from St. Augustine's College
 850 AM WKIX Oldies ("Oldies 104.7")
 1000 AM WRTG Spanish
 1030 AM WDRU Christian ("The Truth 1030")
 1130 AM WPYB Country
 1240 AM WPJL Christian
 1310 AM WTIK Spanish
 1360 AM WCHL ("97.9 The Hill")
 1410 AM WRJD Spanish Christian
 1430 AM WRXO Country ("Simulcast of WKRX-FM")
 1490 AM WDUR South Asian
 1530 AM WLLQ Spanish
 1550 AM WCLY Adult album alternative ("That Station")
 1590 AM WHPY Christian

Map of the Triangle

See also 

 Piedmont Atlantic
 Piedmont Crescent
 Piedmont Triad

References

External links 

 Greater Raleigh Chamber of Commerce
 Research Triangle Regional Partnership
 Triangle Wiki – Local wiki for the Triangle

 
High-technology business districts in the United States
Life sciences industry
Raleigh